Jacob Bell may refer to:

 Jacob Bell (American football) (born 1981), American football guard
 Jacob Bell (chemist) (1810–1859), British pharmaceutical chemist and reformist
 Jacob Bell (shipbuilder) (1792–1852), shipbuilder, Brown & Bell, New York
 USS Jacob Bell (1842), a sidewheel steamer acquired by the Union Navy for use during the American Civil War
 Jacob Bell, a New York pilot boat

Bell, Jacob